Shane McElrath (born 11 August 1994) is an American professional Motocross and Supercross racer. 

McElrath is the reigning FIM Supercross World Champion in the SX2 class. 

He has ridden as a professional in the AMA Supercross Championship and AMA Motocross Championship since 2013. In this time he has finished second twice in the 250SX West class and once in the 250SX East class.

Career 
McElrath made his pro debut for the Troy Lee Designs Lucas Oil Honda team in the final three rounds of the 2013 AMA National Motocross Championship. He was retained for the following year by the team, where he made his debut in the AMA Supercross Championship. Competing in the 250SX West class, he recorded several top-10 finishes including a fifth in San Diego, with a final championship position of ninth. McElrath missed part of the 2014 AMA National Motocross Championship due to a hematoma sustained at the opening round. Despite this he was able to finish in 17th in the final standings with two tenth place finishes as his best results.

In 2015, McElrath stayed with the Troy Lee Designs team as they moved from Honda to KTM. McElrath finished in second place in that season's AMA Supercross Championship in the 250SX West class behind a dominant Cooper Webb, with two second places as his best results. With one third place at race two in Glen Helen, McElrath finished in ninth in the final 250 standings at the AMA National Motocross Championship for that year. A high point outdoors was that year's MXGP of USA, the final round of the 2015 FIM Motocross World Championship. McElrath qualified on pole after the winning the qualifying race in the MX2 class, before finishing in third and second in the grand prix races to finish second overall on his world championship debut.

McElrath switch to the 250SX East class in 2016, picking up two third places, on his way to seventh in the overall standings. His campaign outdoors resulted in his first overall podium in the AMA National Motocross Championship, with third overall at Muddy Creek in Tennessee. Unfortunately, an injury at round seven in Southwick ended his season. For 2017, McElrath moved back to the 250SX West class. The season started with him winning the first two rounds at Anaheim and San Diego, before his championship rival Justin Hill won the following four rounds. McElrath took another win at Salt Lake City, but ultimately finished the series as runner-up to Hill. In the 2017 AMA National Motocross Championship he finished tenth in the final standings with an overall podium at the Budd's Creek round.

McElrath once again won the opening round of the season in the 250SX West championship at Anaheim in 2018. Another win at Salt Lake City later in the championship would secure him third in the final standings behind Aaron Plessinger and Adam Cianciarulo. The 2018 AMA National Motocross Championship would be McElrath's best motocross season up to that point, finishing fifth overall in the final standings in the 250 class. This included his first overall round win at Muddy Creek and his first individual race win in the second race at Washougal. There was one win for McElrath at the second Anaheim round of the 250SX West class in the 2019 AMA Supercross Championship. Unfortunately he was not able to finish the championship and ended in eighth overall. He finished ninth in the 250 standings in the 2019 AMA National Motocross Championship, where he won both races at the Budd's Creek round.

In 2020, McElrath moved away from the Troy Lee Designs team for the first time, as he signed with Star Racing Yamaha. This saw him switch back over to the 250SX East class for the 2020 AMA Supercross Championship, where he took three wins and five other podiums alongside. It would ultimately result in his third runner-up result in supercross, this time behind Chase Sexton. This would be coupled with a third place in the 250 standings in AMA motocross, where he picked up a race win and two overall podiums. 

McElrath started his 450 career in 2021. He signed for the SmartTop Bullfrog Spas Honda team but unfortunately a shoulder injury pre-season meant that he missed the majority of his 450 debut supercross season. For 2022, McElrath signed for Rocky Mountain ATV/MC WPS KTM team for AMA Supercross and Motocross in the 450 class. McElrath improved as the season went on and began to post top-10 results, before the team folded after the second Detroit round. This left McElrath without a ride to complete the supercross series and race motocross in 2022. However, Rockstar Energy Husqvarna would sign McElrath for the 2022 AMA National Motocross Championship, as both of the teams main riders were out with injuries. A fifth place in the second race at Thunder Valley would be the highlight of this stint. With both injured riders returning at the Unadilla round, McElrath rode the final four rounds of the season for the Muc-Off FXR ClubMX Yamaha team. 

Later in 2022, McElrath would be one of the riders signed up to race in the 2022 FIM Supercross World Championship, the first to take place after the demerging of the championship from the AMA Supercross series. Riding for Rick Ware Racing and dropping down to a 250 to race the SX2 class, McElrath was the overall winner of both rounds of the world championship, resulting in him being crowned FIM World Supercross Champion.

For 2023, he has signed to compete for the HEP Motorsports Suzuki team.

Honours 
FIM Supercross World Championship
 SX2: 2022 
AMA Supercross Championship
 250SX East: 2020 
 250SX West: 2015 & 2017  2018 
AMA Motocross Championship
 250: 2020

Career Statistics

FIM Supercross World Championship

By season

FIM Motocross World Championship

By season

AMA Supercross Championship

By season

AMA National Motocross Championship

By season

References

Living people
1994 births
American motocross riders